Un amour à Casablanca (English: A Love in Casablanca) is a 1991 Moroccan drama film directed by Abdelkader Lagtaâ in his directorial debut. The relatively controversial film was a box office success.

Synopsis 
Feeling a strong sense of abandonment after her mother commits suicide and her sister runs away, eighteen-year-old Saloua is constantly fighting with her father and stepmother, because of the severity of one and the mockery of the other. She finds solace - and perhaps even love - in two men, one older and unstable, the other younger and exuberant.

Cast 

 Mouna Fettou
 Ahmed Naji
 Mohamed Zouhir
 Rachid El Ouali
 Hassan Essakalli

References 

1999 films
Moroccan drama films